The 1965 Harvard Crimson football team was an American football team that represented Harvard University during the 1965 NCAA University Division football season. Harvard finished third in the Ivy League.

In their ninth year under head coach John Yovicsin, the Crimson compiled a 5–2–2 record and outscored opponents 120 to 62. Kenneth L. Boyda was the team captain.

Harvard's 3–2–2 conference record was the third-best in the Ivy League standings. The Crimson outscored Ivy opponents 70 to 55. 

Harvard played its home games at Harvard Stadium in the Allston neighborhood of Boston, Massachusetts.

Actor Tommy Lee Jones was a guard on the team.

Schedule

References

Harvard
Harvard Crimson football seasons
Harvard Crimson football
1960s in Boston